Karlov or Karlova (the feminine or possessive form) may refer to:


Places

Czech Republic
Karlov (Žďár nad Sázavou District), a village and municipality in Vysočina Region
Karlova Studánka, a village in Bruntál, Moravian-Silesian Region
Karlova Ves (Rakovník District), a village and municipality in the Central Bohemian Region
Karlova Koruna Chateau, in Chlumec nad Cidlinou, Hradec Králové Region
Velký Karlov, a village and municipality in Znojmo, South Moravian Region
Univerzita Karlova or Charles University, Prague

Other places
Karlova, Tartu, a neighbourhood of Tartu, Estonia
Tartu Karlova Gümnaasium, Estonia
Karlová, a village and municipality in Slovakia
Karlova Ves, a borough in Bratislava, Slovakia

Other uses
Karlov (surname)

See also

Karlos (disambiguation)